Pisang Peak (Jong Ri) is a pyramidal trekking peak above Pisang, a village on the Annapurna Circuit, within the Manang District, northern Nepal. It was first climbed by a German Expedition in 1955.

References

External links 

 Pisang Peak on SummitPost
 Pisang Peak on Nepal Mountaineering Association

Six-thousanders of the Himalayas
Mountains of the Gandaki Province